MIL-CD or Music Interactive Live CD is a compact disc format created by the video game company Sega in 1998. The main purpose of MIL-CD was to add multimedia functions to music CDs, for use in Sega's Dreamcast video game console. For example, MIL-CD music releases were to feature enhanced navigational menus, internet capabilities, and full-screen video. It was similar to tests done with Audio CD/CD-ROM combo discs on PCs, DVD-Video/DVD-ROM combo discs on PCs, game systems and DVD Players, as well as game/video combo discs for systems like the PlayStation 3.   

MIL-CD was not a widely adopted format for what Sega had intended due to lack of official third-party support; very few official MIL-CD releases were made, notably the soundtrack to D2; all of them were only available in Japan. Meanwhile, Dreamcast's support for the MIL-CD format allowed hackers to bypass the Dreamcast security, allowing the creation of such utilities as the Bleemcast PlayStation emulator, the creation of homebrew titles for the machine, and ability to run bootleg games and games from other regions via Code Breaker or older apps like Utopia bootdisk. Very late versions of the Dreamcast dropped support for MIL-CD format to reduce piracy.

See also
GD-ROM

References

Dreamcast
Digital audio
Video game music file formats
Computer-related introductions in 1999